Magua is a fictional Indian character in James Fenimore Cooper's The Last of the Mohicans.

Magua may also refer to :

 The Roman Catholic Diocese of Magua, short-lived Latin bishopric in what is now La Vega, Dominican Republic
 Magua (clothing), a type of Chinese jacket worn during the Qing dynasty (1644–1911)
 Magua (spider), an Australian spider genus in the family Amphinectidae

See also